is a Japanese amateur astronomer and an outstanding discoverer of minor planets who currently works at the Ōizumi Observatory. The asteroid 3500 Kobayashi is named after him.

Career 
Kobayashi has discovered more than 2000 asteroids using CCD technology, including the Amor asteroids 7358 Oze,  and about nine Trojan asteroids. He also discovered the periodic comet P/1997 B1 (Kobayashi), which he originally reported as an asteroid.

His asteroid discoveries of January 16, 1994 and December 31, 1994 have been named 8883 Miyazakihayao and 10160 Totoro by Kobayashi. The names reference anime filmmaker Hayao Miyazaki, and one of his creations, My Neighbor Totoro. The names were approved by the International Astronomical Union. Kobayashi is not to be confused with another Japanese astronomer, Toru Kobayashi, who co-discovered comet C/1975 N1 (Kobayashi-Berger-Milon).

P/1997 B1 Kobayashi 
On January 30 and January 31, 1997, Kobayashi observed an object, P/1997 B1 Kobayashi, which was initially thought to be a minor planet and was reported to the IAU as such by Syuichi Nakano. Over the next few days, the object was observed to be in a cometary orbit. Warren B. Offutt later showed it to be a comet.

List of discovered minor planets

See also

References 
 

1961 births
21st-century Japanese astronomers
Discoverers of asteroids
Discoverers of comets

20th-century Japanese astronomers
Living people